Netrin-G1 is a protein that in humans is encoded by the NTNG1 gene.

Netrin G1 (NTNG1) belongs to a conserved family of proteins that act as axon guidance cues during vertebrate nervous system development (Nakashiba et al., 2000).[supplied by OMIM]

References

Further reading

Netrins